Choleando (also known as Choleando: Racism in Peru) is a 2012 Peruvian documentary film written and directed by Roberto de la Puente in his directorial debut. It stars Mariananda Schempp & Julio Navarro. It premiered on February 23, 2012, at the 2012 Ibero-American Digital Film Festival.

Synopsis 
For Mariananda there is no doubt: it is because of racism. There always has been, always will be. But Julio is not so sure. Is it really about racism? Are they not confusing racism with the many other types of discrimination that we Peruvians practice? To begin with: what is racism? This documentary will try to resolve which of the two is right, reviewing the multiple forms of discrimination that we Peruvians practice, investigating their origins and their unfortunate consequences. Through interviews, animations and supporting images, Mariananda and Julio will gain an in-depth understanding of Peru's confusing system of racial discrimination.

Cast 

 Julio Navarro as himself
 Mariananda Schempp as herself

References

External links 

 

2012 films
2012 documentary films
Peruvian documentary films
2010s Spanish-language films
2010s Peruvian films
Films set in Peru
Films shot in Peru
Documentary films about racism
2012 directorial debut films